Richard Earl Locher (June 4, 1929 – August 6, 2017) was an American syndicated cartoonist.

Early life and career
Locher was born in Dubuque, Iowa. After high school, he began studying art at the University of Iowa and the Chicago Academy of Fine Arts. While in Chicago, he became an assistant to Rick Yager, who was drawing Buck Rogers at the time. However, he left the job after a few months to enlist in the Air Force, where he became a test pilot. While at the Air Force, he began freelancing for the Stars and Stripes.

In 1957, he began assisting Chester Gould on Dick Tracy, where he inked the figures and colored the Sunday strips. He also contributed to a story that was cited in Gould's 1959 Reuben award. He left the strip in 1961 to work on other areas, including starting an advertising company, where he worked on designing characters for McDonald's.

Locher kept in touch with Chester Gould even after leaving the strip. In 1973, an editorial cartoonist position at the Chicago Tribune opened up and Gould recommended Locher to take the position. Despite having no experience in editorial cartooning, the Tribune hired Locher. Locher retired May 1, 2013.

Locher, working with his son John, returned to work on Dick Tracy in 1983, when its previous cartoonist, Rick Fletcher, died. That same year, he won the Pulitzer Prize for Editorial Cartooning. In 2009, Jim Brozman took over the drawing of Dick Tracy; however Locher continued to write the storylines and contributed sketches. In 2011, Locher retired from Dick Tracy and handed the reins to the new creative team of Mike Curtis and Joe Staton. Locher's last Dick Tracy strip was published Sunday, March 13, 2011.

In 2006, Locher was inducted into the Oklahoma Cartoonists Hall of Fame in Pauls Valley, Oklahoma by Michael Vance. The Oklahoma Cartoonists Collection, created by Vance, is located in the Toy and Action Figure Museum.

In 2013, Locher helped design and make a 9.5-foot bronze statue of Naperville's founding father, Capt. Joseph Naper.

Personal life
Locher lived in Naperville, Illinois, with his wife, Mary, at the time of his passing.

Locher had three children: Stephen, who lives in the Chicago area; John, who died in 1986; and Jana, who lives in Colorado.

The new Land of Lincoln Trophy designed by Dick Locher goes to the winner of the Northwestern-Illinois college football game.

Locher died on August 6, 2017, in Naperville, Illinois, aged 88. His death was caused by complications from Parkinson's disease.

References

1929 births
2017 deaths
American comic strip cartoonists
American editorial cartoonists
Artists from Iowa
Chicago Tribune people
Dick Tracy
People from Dubuque, Iowa
Pulitzer Prize for Editorial Cartooning winners
School of the Art Institute of Chicago alumni
United States Air Force officers
University of Iowa alumni